Jacobus Spoors (Hazerswoude, 14 September 1751 - The Hague, 3 April 1833) was a Dutch politician (Patriot party) in the Batavian Republic.

Career
Attorney, Leiden, since 1777
Member for Leiden,  Provisionele Representanten van het Volk van Holland, 26-01-1795 -
Member, Comité van Waakzaamheid van Holland, 1795
 advocaat-fiscaal (prosecutor) Comité tot de Zaken van de Koloniën en Bezittingen op de kust van Guinea en in Amerika, 13-10-1795 - 10-02-1798
 agent (government minister) Agentschap van Marine (Department of the Navy), 10-02-1798 - 06-1798
 Member Intermediair Uitvoerend Bewind, 13-06-1798 - 17-08-1798
 agent, Agentschap van Marine, 25-12-1798 - 17-10-1801
Member Staatsbewind of the Batavian Republic, 21-10-1801 - 29-04-1805

References

Sources
 (1948) Onze ministers sinds 1798, N. Samsom

External links
Jacob Spoors

1751 births
1833 deaths
18th-century Dutch lawyers
Members of the Dutch Patriots faction
People from Hazerswoude